Kayla may refer to:
Kayla (name), a feminine given name (and list of people with the name)
Kayla (Beta Israel), a Beta Israel community
Kayla, Bhiwani, a village in Haryana, India
Kayla River, a river in Gujarat, India
Kayla dialect, an Agaw language of Beta Israel

See also
Cayla (disambiguation)
Kalla (disambiguation)